Fremont or Frémont is a surname and male given name.  Notable people with the name include:

Surname
Christian Frémont, French préfet
John C. Frémont (1813-1890), American officer, explorer and politician
Jessie Benton Frémont (1824–1902), American writer and wife of John C. Frémont
Ludovico Fremont (born 1982), Italian actor
Thierry Frémont (born 1962), French actor

Given name
Fremont C. Chamberlain (1856–1931), member of the Michigan House of Representatives
Fremont Cole (1856–1915), American lawyer and politician from New York
Fremont Older (1856–1935), American newspaper editor
Fremont D. Orff, American architect
Fremont O. Phillips (1856–1936), U.S. Representative from Ohio
Fremont Rider (1885–1962), American writer, poet, and editor
Fremont Wood (1856–1940), American attorney and judge from Idaho

See also
Fremont (disambiguation)

French-language surnames